Arisaig Provincial Park is a provincial park located in Antigonish, Nova Scotia, Canada.

References

Parks in Nova Scotia
Antigonish, Nova Scotia